France competed at the 1948 Summer Olympics in Wembley Park, London, England. 316 competitors, 279 men and 37 women, took part in 135 events in 20 sports.

Medalists

Athletics

Men
Track & road events

Field events

Women
Track & road events

Field events

Basketball

Boxing

Canoeing

Cycling

Eleven cyclists, all men, represented France in 1948.

Individual road race
 José Beyaert
 Alain Moineau
 Jacques Dupont
 René Rouffeteau

Team road race
 José Beyaert
 Alain Moineau
 Jacques Dupont
 René Rouffeteau

Sprint
 Jacques Bellenger

Time trial
 Jacques Dupont

Tandem
 René Faye
 Gaston Dron

Team pursuit
 Charles Coste
 Serge Blusson
 Fernand Decanali
 Pierre Adam

Diving

Equestrian

Fencing

21 fencers, 18 men and 3 women, represented France in 1948.

Men's foil
 Jéhan Buhan
 Christian d'Oriola
 René Bougnol

Men's team foil
 André Bonin, Jéhan Buhan, Jacques Lataste, René Bougnol, Christian d'Oriola, Adrien Rommel

Men's épée
 Henri Guérin
 Henri Lepage
 Marcel Desprets

Men's team épée
 Henri Guérin, Henri Lepage, Marcel Desprets, Michel Pécheux, Édouard Artigas, Maurice Huet

Men's sabre
 Jacques Lefèvre
 Jean Levavasseur
 Maurice Gramain

Men's team sabre
 Jean-François Tournon, Jacques Parent, Maurice Gramain, Jacques Lefèvre, Jean Levavasseur, Georges Lévêcque

Women's foil
 Renée Garilhe
 Louisette Malherbaud
 Françoise Gouny

Football

Gymnastics

Hockey

Modern pentathlon

Three male pentathletes represented France in 1948.

 André Lacroix
 Louis Pichon
 Christian Palant

Rowing

France had 22 male rowers participate in six out of seven rowing events in 1948.

 Men's single sculls
 Jean Séphériadès

 Men's double sculls
 Jacques Maillet
 Christian Guilbert

 Men's coxless pair
 Paul Rothley
 Paul Heitz

 Men's coxed pair
 Ampelio Sartor
 Aristide Sartor
 Roger Crezen (cox)

 Men's coxed four
 Jean-Paul Pieddeloup
 René Lotti
 Gaston Maquat
 Jean-Pierre Souche
 Marcel Boigegrain (cox)

 Men's eight
 Pierre Fauveau
 Pierre Sauvestre
 Alphonse Bouton
 Erik Aschehoug
 Jean Bocahut
 René Boucher
 Pierre Clergerie
 Roger Lebranchu
 Robert Léon (cox)

Sailing

Shooting

Twelve shooters represented France in 1948.

25 metre pistol
 Charles des Jammonières
 R. Bouillet
 Didier Hesse

50 metre pistol
 Jacques Mazoyer
 Marcel Bonin
 R. Stéphan

300 metre rifle
 Jean Fournier
 Édouard Rouland
 Stéphane Lesceux

50 metre rifle
 Georges Gauthier-Lafond
 Lucien Genot
 M. Bouchez

Swimming

Water polo

Weightlifting

Wrestling

Art competitions

References

External links
Official Olympic Reports
International Olympic Committee results database

Nations at the 1948 Summer Olympics
1948
Summer Olympics